YooHoo & Friends is a Korean animated children's television series based on the toyline of the same name, produced by Korean toy manufacturer Aurora World. The series debuted on the Korean broadcasting channel KBS2, and later on KBS1 from July 2, 2009 to April 9, 2015.

Series overview

Episodes

Season 1 (2009)

Season 2 (2013–14)
On Amazon, 4 episodes have not been included in the English release.

Season 3 (2015)
Unlike the first two seasons, this season has not had an official English release on Amazon and Netflix.

References

Lists of South Korean animated television series episodes